The 2018–19 Hong Kong First Division League was the 5th season of Hong Kong First Division since it became the second-tier football league in Hong Kong in 2014–15. The season began on 9 September 2018 and ended on 12 May 2019.

Teams

Changes from last season

From First Division

Promoted to the Hong Kong Premier League
 Hoi King

Relegated to the Second Division
 Sun Hei 
 Tung Sing 
 Kwun Tong 
 Wan Chai

To First Division

Relegated from the Premier League
 Rangers

Promoted from the Second Division
 Happy Valley
 Central & Western

League table

References

Hong Kong First Division League seasons
2018–19 in Hong Kong football
Hong Kong